is a train station on the Kagoshima Main Line located in Higashi-ku, Fukuoka, Fukuoka City, Fukuoka Prefecture, Japan. It is operated by JR Kyushu.

Lines

Layout
The station consists of a side and two island platforms serving five tracks.

Platforms

History
The Kyushu Railway was nationalized on 1 July 1907, Japanese Government Railways (JGR) took over control of the station. On 12 October 1909, the station became part of the Hitoyoshi Main Line and then on 21 November 1909, part of the Kagoshima Main Line. In 1942, the Hakata Railway, now renamed the Hakata Railway and Steamship Company merged with other companies, becoming the Nishi Nippon Railroad (Nishitetsu). On 1 May 1944, Nishitetsu's line from Saitozaki to Sue and its later extensions to Shinbaru and Umi were also nationalized and became designated as the Kashii Line. With the privatization of Japanese National Railways (JNR), the successor of JGR, on 1 April 1987, JR Kyushu took over control of the station.

Passenger statistics
In fiscal 2016, the station was used by 12,172 passengers daily, and it ranked 10th among the busiest stations of JR Kyushu.

See also 
List of railway stations in Japan

References

External links
Kashii Station (JR Kyushu)

Railway stations in Fukuoka Prefecture
Railway stations in Japan opened in 1890